Kosaŭka  is a town in Minsk Region, Belarus. It is located south of Byerazino and belongs to Byerazino District.

References

Populated places in Minsk Region
Byerazino District
Agrotowns in Belarus